Aola Mary Richards (16 December 1927 – 2021) was a New Zealand entomologist specialising in the study of New Zealand and Australian cave crickets (Rhaphidophoridae) and Australian ladybird beetles (Coccinellidae). She was the first New Zealand woman to gain a PhD in Biology.

Early life 
Richards was born in Wellington, New Zealand. She was the only child of Hinemoa C C Hopkins, a lawyer, and David James Richard, a university mathematics professor from Wales. Richards' parents were married just a few years before they separated. Richards attended Queen Margaret's College then Samuel Marsden Collegiate School for Girls in Wellington. She gained First Class MSc in Zoology in 1954 from the University of New Zealand. Richards was awarded a New Zealand University research fund fellowship, and in 1958 she became the first woman in New Zealand to gain a PhD in Biological Science.

Career 
Richards worked at Plant Diseases Division, New Zealand Department of Scientific and Industrial Research, Auckland and then moved to Australia. She worked within the Biology Department of the University of New South Wales for 33 years.

Richards published more than 80 papers, many of them taxonomic revisions and species descriptions with a single author. Her most cited works are on the life history and feeding biology of beetles and wētā.

Richards' PhD research initiated her love of caves and the fauna that lives in caves. This led to field work across Australia and Europe and involvement in speleological societies. Along with Ted Lane she was the founding editor of Helictite, providing a news service and collection of speleological papers. Richards inspired the study of the animals that live in caves in Tasmania and her species descriptions contributed to conservation efforts.

Richards made a major contribution to the taxonomy of New Zealand and Australian Rhaphidophoridae (cave crickets/wētā). She described five genera from New Zealand and more than twenty new species comprising almost all of the Australian taxa. A cave wētā species was named for her in 2018: Miotopus richardsae.

In Australia, Richards also studied ladybird beetles. Her taxonomic work is highly cited and her studies of feeding biology revealed novel plant-insect interactions. Richards and Filewood were the first to describe how beetles can avoid toxic plant compounds by chewing through the leafstalk of their food plant. Referred to as "trench warfare", this behaviour allows ladybird beetles to isolate a region of the plant, preventing toxic plant compounds reaching them.

Selected publications 
 Richards, A. M. (1983). "The Epilachna vigintiotopunctata complex (Coleoptera: Coccinellidae)." International Journal of Entomology . 25(1): 11–41.
 Richards, A. M. (1981). "Rhyzobius ventralis (Erichson) and R. forestieri (Mulsant) (Coleoptera: Coccinellidae), their biology and value for scale insect control." Bulletin of Entomological Research. 71(1): 33–46. DOI: https://doi.org/10.1017/S0007485300051002
 Richards, A. M. (1973). "A comparative study of the biology of the Giant wetas Deinacrida heteracantha and D. fallai (Orthoptera: Henicidae) from New Zealand." Journal of Zoology. 169(2): 195–236.
 Richards A. M. (1971). "An ecological study of the cavernicolous fauna of the Nullarbor Plain Southern Australia." Journal of Zoology. 164(1): 1–60.

References 

1927 births
2021 deaths
Scientists from Wellington City
Women entomologists
New Zealand expatriates in Australia
21st-century New Zealand women scientists
University of New South Wales people
20th-century New Zealand women scientists
University of New Zealand alumni
New Zealand entomologists